A religious exemption is a legal privilege that exempts members of a certain religion from a law, regulation, or requirement. Religious exemptions are often justified as a protection of religious freedom, and proponents of religious exemptions argue that complying with a law against one's faith is a greater harm than complying against a law that one otherwise disagrees with due to a fear of divine judgment. Opponents of religious exemptions argue that they mandate unequal treatment and undermine the rule of law.

Issues 
Many religions incorporate drug use into their practices or consider certain illegal drugs to be sacred. In areas where these drugs are illegal, religious groups may petition for a religious exemption. The use of cannabis is traditional in Rastafari, and the use of peyote is traditional for some Native American tribes. Laws governing alcohol may sometimes grant exceptions for practices such as Eucharist.

Religious opposition to medical procedures has prompted debate on religious exemptions in medicine. Many places allow for religious exemptions from vaccination. Jehovah's Witnesses have challenged child neglect laws that obligate the parent to provide medical assistance to their children.

Some religions have requirements on how adherents may dress or groom. Many governments require companies and organizations to provide exceptions for religious apparel that would typically violate a dress code. In many other places, certain religious articles of clothing are rendered illegal by laws governing public attire. Sikhism requires that adherents carry a kirpan, which often requires a religious exemption to laws regarding the carrying of weapons.

Churches, marriage officiants, and government employees that oppose same-sex marriage may seek religious exemptions from involvement in such marriages.

Islam and Judaism both have specific traditions regarding the slaughter of animals. Some governments have made exemptions to their animal cruelty laws to permit these traditions.

By country

Australia 
Section 116 of the Constitution of Australia guarantees that the federal government shall not prohibit the free exercise of religion. Religious organizations are exempt from the Sex Discrimination Act 1984 and are legally permitted to discriminate based on sex, sexual orientation, gender identity, intersex status, relationship status, and pregnancy. A religious exemption in 1998 allowed members of the Church of Christ, Scientist to refuse child vaccination without losing welfare benefits, but the exemption was ended in 2015.

Canada 
The Canadian Charter of Rights and Freedoms establishes a right to "freedom of conscience and religion". In 1985, the Supreme Court of Canada ruled that a business could not be compelled to close on Sunday for religious reasons in R v Big M Drug Mart Ltd. In 2004, the Supreme Court ruled that Hasidic Jews had the right to observe Sukkot on a condominium balcony against the wishes of the property owner.

United Kingdom 
Under Article 9 of the Human Rights Act 1998, citizens of the United Kingdom are guaranteed the right to hold religious beliefs. The government reserves the power to legally restrict the expression of religious beliefs in the name of public safety, public order, health and morals, and the rights of others. 

The House of Lords has ruled that dress codes banning religious accessories are undue but that a dress code banning a full body jilbāb is within reason. The English Court of Appeal has ruled in several cases that laws promoting equal rights outweigh the right to discriminate due to religious belief.

United States 
In the United States, the First Amendment guarantees that Congress will make no law "prohibiting the free exercise" of religion, and this clause is used as justification for the legality of religious exemptions in the United States. The earliest court case litigating religious exemptions was the New York case People v. Phillips in 1813, ruling that a Catholic priest could not be compelled to testify on a confession in violation of his duty as a priest. In 1878, the Supreme Court of the United States ruled that the government could ban polygamy without a religious exemption in Reynolds v. United States. In 1943, the Supreme Court did grant a religious exemption to an ordinance against door-to-door solicitation in Murdock v. Pennsylvania. In 1972, the Supreme Court established the "Sherbert test" in Sherbert v. Verner, establishing a standard of strict scrutiny on religious exemptions. The Supreme Court moved away from religious exemptions in Employment Division v. Smith in 1990.

In the 1990s, Congress passed the Religious Freedom Restoration Act and the American Indian Religious Freedom Act to write religious exemptions into law. The Religious Freedom Restoration Act authorized the government to enforce a law against religious practice only if it "furthers a compelling governmental interest" and it is the "least restrictive means" to pursue this interest. The American Indian Religious Freedom Act granted a religious exemption for the use of peyote for religious purposes by Native American tribes. Many states have since passed their own versions of the Religious Freedom Restoration Act to extend its coverage to state law.

In 2014, the Supreme Court ruled in favor of religious exemptions for private businesses in Burwell v. Hobby Lobby Stores, Inc. Legal scholars have considered a wide variety of implications that may result from this decision, many of which have yet to be tested in court.

A substantial area of religious exemptions in the United States are those that allow individuals to avoid vaccination mandates. For childhood vaccination mandates, most U.S. states provide some kind of religious exemption, with standards for receiving such an exemption varying from a minimal statement in some states to a more searching examination of the sincerity of the beliefs claimed in others. 

, 44 states and the District of Columbia grant exemptions for people who have religious objections to immunizations. The six states that do not recognize a religious objection are California (California Senate Bill 277), Connecticut, Maine (2020 Maine Question 1), Mississippi, New York, and West Virginia. Until 2019, only Mississippi, West Virginia and California did not permit religious exemptions. However, the 2019 measles outbreak led to the repeal of religious exemptions in the state of New York and for the MMR vaccination in the state of Washington.

See also 

 Accommodationism
 Law and religion
 Religion in politics

References 

Religion and society
Religion and government
Religion and law